Love at First Sting is the ninth studio album by German rock band Scorpions. It was released in March 1984 on Harvest/EMI in Europe and Mercury in the US. The album contains "Rock You Like a Hurricane", "Still Loving You", and "Big City Nights", three of the band's most famous songs.

Music

Background and recording
The album was recorded in 1983 and 1984 at Dierks Studios in Stommeln, West Germany. Initial sessions took place in Stockholm's Polar Studios in the Summer of 1983 with ex-Rainbow members Jimmy Bain on bass and Bobby Rondinelli on drums, but nothing made it to the final album. Love at First Sting is notable in that it was one of the first digitally recorded heavy metal records ever released.

It became the group's most successful album in the US, where it peaked at number 6 on the Billboard 200 chart in 1984, and went double-platinum by the end of the year, reaching triple-platinum status in 1995. The song "Rock You Like a Hurricane" reached number 25 on the Billboard Hot 100 chart in the same year; "Still Loving You" reached number 64 on the same chart, number 14 in Germany, and number 3 in the French and Swiss single charts.

Artwork
The original cover art was created by Kochlowski, which is a German graphic design company, and features a photo shot by renowned German photographer Helmut Newton. Despite the record company having shown the original cover art to retailers without any concerns, a complaint by Walmart in the US after the album was released resulted in PolyGram Records issuing a "clean" cover for use in several department store chains. The alternative cover was designed to be less controversial by simply showing a photo of the band members, which was the same photo as the one on the inner sleeve.

Track listing

Personnel

Scorpions
 Klaus Meine – lead vocals, backing vocals
 Rudolf Schenker – rhythm guitar, lead guitar on 6, 7 & 9, backing vocals
 Matthias Jabs – lead guitar, rhythm guitar on 6, 7 & 9, backing vocals
 Francis Buchholz – bass, Moog Taurus, backing vocals 
 Herman Rarebell – drums, backing vocals

Production
Dieter Dierks – producer, mixing
Gerd Rautenbach – engineer, mastering
Kochlowski/Missmahl/Pieczulski – cover design

Charts

Album

Singles

Certifications

References

External links
 Official website

1984 albums
Scorpions (band) albums
EMI Records albums
Harvest Records albums
Mercury Records albums
Albums produced by Dieter Dierks
Glam metal albums